National Secondary Route 255, or just Route 255 (or ) is a National Road Route of Costa Rica, located in the Guanacaste province.

Description
In Guanacaste province the route covers Carrillo canton (Sardinal district).

References

Highways in Costa Rica